Teesside Park is a retail and leisure park in Thornaby-on-Tees, built in 1988. Located just off the A66 near the A66/A19 interchange, it is split between the unitary authorities of Stockton-on-Tees (retail park) and Middlesbrough (leisure park) with the line of the Old River Tees, which runs down the middle of the development, forming the boundary between the two authorities. The development has a central building that was constructed in 2008.

Site

The Stockton-on-Tees section is within the town of Thornaby-on-Tees and is all located within the ceremonial county of North Yorkshire. The driving force behind its growth was originally the Teesside Development Corporation in the late 1980s when the two current unitary authorities were part of the county Cleveland.

It is built on the former site of Stockton Racecourse: multiple roads in the park being named after famous racecourses such as Aintree and Goodwood. It is home to a number of retail chains and has a Morrisons supermarket.  Its catchment area covers much of the Tees Valley and much of the north of North Yorkshire. There is a new development in the central car park with two new inner buildings. Construction started in March 2012. The two new units are occupied by Greggs and Carphone Warehouse, which moved from an outer building. The two new units officially opened in August 2012.

Transport 

Teesside Park is served by Arriva bus services between Stockton and Middlesbrough.

Leisure park 

 Burger King
 Rainbow Casino (Closed 26 September 2016)
 Hollywood Bowl
 Pizza Hut
 Showcase Cinema De Lux

References

External links 

 Teesside Shopping Park
 Retailer Representative Annual Report

Places in the Tees Valley
Middlesbrough
Shopping centres in North Yorkshire
Retail parks in the United Kingdom
Thornaby-on-Tees
Shopping malls established in 1988
1988 establishments in England